Necronomicon: The Best Weird Tales of H.P. Lovecraft: Commemorative Edition is a select collection of horror short stories, novellas and novels written by H. P. Lovecraft. The book was published in 2008 by Gollancz and is edited by Stephen Jones.

Contents
 "Night-Gaunts" (poem)
 "Dagon"
 "The Statement of Randolph Carter"
 "The Doom that Came to Sarnath"
 "The Cats of Ulthar"
 "The Nameless City"
 "Herbert West–Reanimator"
 "The Music of Erich Zann"
 "The Lurking Fear"
 "The Hound"
 "The Rats in the Walls"
 "Under the Pyramids"
 "The Unnamable"
 "In the Vault"
 "The Outsider"
 "The Horror at Red Hook"
 "The Colour Out of Space"
 "Pickman's Model"
 "The Call of Cthulhu"
 "Cool Air"
 "The Shunned House"
 "The Silver Key"
 "The Dunwich Horror"
 "The Whisperer in Darkness"
 "The Strange High House in the Mist"
 "The Dreams in the Witch House"
 "From Beyond"
 "Through the Gates of the Silver Key"
 "At the Mountains of Madness"
 "The Shadow Over Innsmouth"
 "The Shadow Out of Time"
 "The Haunter of the Dark"
 "The Thing on the Doorstep"
 "The Case of Charles Dexter Ward"
 "The Dream-Quest of Unknown Kadath"
 "To a Dreamer" (poem)
 Afterword: A Gentleman of Providence, by Stephen Jones

2008 short story collections
Short story collections by H. P. Lovecraft
Cthulhu Mythos anthologies